Murrin Murrin Airport  is located near the Murrin Murrin Joint Venture, Western Australia.

See also
 List of airports in Western Australia

References

External links
 Airservices Aerodromes & Procedure Charts

Airports in Western Australia
Goldfields-Esperance